Bandhavgarh National Park is a national park of India, located in the Umaria district of Madhya Pradesh.

This park has a large biodiversity. The park has a large breeding population of leopards, and various species of deer. Maharaja Martand Singh of Rewa captured the first white tiger in this region in 1951. This white tiger, Mohan, is now stuffed and on display in the palace of the Maharajas of Rewa. Historically villagers and their cattle have been at a threat from the tiger. Rising mining activities around the park are putting the tigers at risk. The park derives its name from the most prominent hill of the area, which is said to have been given by Lord Rama to his brother Lakshmana to keep a watch on Lanka (Bandhav = Brother, Garh = Fort). The fort was built by a Gond Dynasty king.

Structure
The three main zones of the national park are Tala, Magdhi and Khitauli. Tala is the richest zone in terms of biodiversity, mainly tigers. Altogether, these three ranges comprise the 'core' of the Bandhavgarh Tiger Reserve, constituting a total area of 716 km2.

Fauna

With the tiger at the apex of the food chain, it contains at least 37 species of mammals. According to forest officials, there are more than 250 species of birds, about 80 species of butterflies, a number of reptiles. But many people have the species' list of about 350 birds along with photographs. The richness and tranquity of grasslands invites pairs of sarus cranes to breed in the rainy season.

One of the biggest attractions of this national park is the Bengal tiger (Panthera tigris tigris). Bandhavgarh has a very high density of tigers within its jungles. The 105 km2 of park area open to tourists was reported to have 22 tigers, a density of one tiger for every 4.77 km2. (Population estimation exercise 2001). The population of tigers in the park in 2012 was about 44–49. There is a saying about the Park that goes: "In any other Park, you are lucky if you see a tiger. In Bandhavgarh, you are unlucky if you don't see (at least) one." Bandhavgarh has one of the highest density of tigers known in the world and is home to some well-known tigers which are large. Charger, a tiger so named because of his habit of charging at elephants and tourists (whom he nonetheless did not harm), was the first healthy male known to be living in Bandhavgarh since the 1990s, as well as a female known as Sita. Charger once appeared on the cover of National Geographic and is considered the second most photographed tiger in the world. Almost all the  tigers of Bandhavgarh today are descendants of Sita and Charger. Their daughter Joita, sons Langru and B2 also maintained their tradition for frequent sighting and moving close to tourist vehicles. Mohini, another female, became prominent following Sita's death. She mated with the male tiger, Mahaman. She later died of her wounds from a vehicle accident. Charger died in 2000 and his body was buried at Charger Point where he was kept in a closed region at his old age. Between 2003 and 2006, many of his descendants met with a series of unfortunate ends. B1 was electrocuted and B3 was killed by poachers. Sita was killed by poachers too. After the death of Charger, the fully grown B2 survived as the dominant male in the forest between 2004 and 2007.  Mating with a female in the Siddhababa region of Bandhavgarh, he became father of three cubs. One of them was a male. He was named Bamera. He was first sighted in 2008 and is now Bandhavgarh's dominant male. In November 2011, B2 died. Postmortem studies suggest that he died a natural death. But some  claim that he was injured by the locals from the village in the buffer area. Now, the most prominent tiger in Tala zone of Bandhavgarh National Park is Bamera (died recently). However, of late he has been challenged on several occasions by a new male. Blue Eyes (died recently due to drug over dose) and Mukunda are the dominant males of Magdhi and Khitauli zone respectively. The females who are seen more frequently are Rajbehra, Mirchaini, Banbehi, Mahaman, Sukhi Pattiya and Damdama. There are quite a few cubs also who are either in sub-adult stage or have entered adulthood and are separate now.

The reserve is also densely populated with other species: the gaur or Indian bison (Bos gaurus gaurus), are now extinct or have migrated elsewhere; sambar and barking deer are a common sight, and nilgai are to be seen in the open areas of the park. There have been reports of the Indian wolf (Canis lupus pallipes), striped hyena (Hyaena hyaena hyaena) and the caracal (Caracal caracal schmitzi) the latter being an exclusive open area dweller. The tiger reserve abounds with chital or the spotted deer (Axis axis) which is the main prey animal of the tiger and the Indian leopard (Panthera pardus fusca). The Indian bison were reintroduced from Kanha.

Reintroduction of gaur
Bandhavgarh National Park had a small population of gaur, but due to disease passed from cattle to them, all of them died. The project of reintroduction of gaurs dealt with shifting some gaurs from Kanha National Park to Bandhavgarh. 50 animals were shifted by the winter of 2012. This project was executed by Madhya Pradesh Forest department, Wildlife Institute of India and Taj Safaris by technical collaboration.

Transportation
Bandavgarh National Park is roughly 4.5hrs (~200kms) drive from the nearest major city, Jabalpur. Jabalpur is very well connected to Delhi, Mumbai, Bangalore, Hyderabad, Pune and Indore via air travel.
Bandhavgarh does not have the airport facility for mainstream flights, but Jabalpur city, which is the nearest city to Bandhavgarh, has good air connectivity with major cities of India. Private charters can land near Bandhavgarh National Park, Umaria district also has a small air-strip facility for charter planes. Jabalpur Airport (199 km/04:30hrs) is the best option to reach Bandhavgarh National Park as it is connected to:  Delhi, Mumbai, Bangalore, Kolkata, Hyderabad,  and Bhopal, with these airline options AirIndia, SpiceJet & IndiGo.

Train
Travel by train is another good option. Travel to Umaria junction by train and hire a cab or taxi to the National Park.

Birds
Some of the typical and peculiar birds found in Bandhavgarh national park are

Plum-headed parakeet
Green-headed barbet
Orange-headed thrush
Brown-headed barbet
Coppersmith barbet
Common myna
Alexandrine parakeet
Indian grey hornbill
Rock pigeon
House crow
Carrion crow
Little egret
Cattle egret
Great egret
Black drongo
Pond heron
Common snipe
Black-winged stilt
Red-wattled lapwing
Indian peafowl
Greater coucal
Oriental magpie robin
Indian roller
Indian robin
Eurasian collared dove
Hoopoe
Sirkeer malkoha
Large-billed crow
White-browed fantail flycatcher
Yellow-crowned woodpecker
Rufous treepie (normal and pallida)
Lesser adjutant stork
Oriental white eye
Olive-backed pipit
Spotted dove
White-throated kingfisher
Red-rumped swallow
Lesser whistling teal
Common kingfisher
Black stork
Asian green bee-eater
Greater racket-tailed drongo
Red-vented bulbul
Long-billed vulture
Grey-capped pygmy woodpecker
Chestnut-shouldered petronia
Crested serpent eagle
Black redstart
Brahminy starling
Brown fish owl
Yellow-footed green pigeon
Malabar pied hornbill
Common kestrel
White-throated fantail flycatcher
Rufous woodpecker
Sapphire flycatcher
Crested hawk eagle (Cirrhatus)
Oriental turtle dove
White-rumped vulture
Lesser kestrel
Large cuckooshrike
Pied bushchat
Black-winged cuckooshrike
Black-rumped flameback woodpecker
House sparrow
Golden oriole
Rose-ringed parakeet
Paddyfield pipit
Dusky crag martin
Long-tailed shrike
Black ibis
White-necked stork
Purple sunbird
Giant leafbird
Tickell's flowerpecker
Little cormorant
Little brown dove
White-tailed swallow
Jungle babbler
Shikra
Jungle myna
Common tailorbird
Red collared dove
Red-necked vulture
Painted francolin
Eurasian thick-knee
Common sandpiper
Lesser spotted eagle
Greater whistling teal
Great cormorant
Pied kingfisher
Laughing dove
Bonelli's eagle
Dark black crow
Asian pied starling
Asian Duck

See also
 Arid Forest Research Institute
 Indian Council of Forestry Research and Education

References

 Aqeel Farooqi: A Tribute to Charger 
 L.K.Chaudhari & Safi Akhtar Khan: Bandhavgarh-Fort of the Tiger, Wild Atlas Books, Bhopal, 2003
 Shahbaz Ahmad: Charger: The Long Living Tiger, Print World, Allahabad, 2001 
 W.A.Rodgers, H.S.Panwar and V.B.Mathur: Wildlife Protected Area Network in India: A review, Wildlife Institute of India, Dehradun, 2000
 Captain J.Forsyth: The Highlands of Central India, Natraj Publishers, Dehradun, 1994.

External links

 In tiger territory, A.J.T.Johnsingh and Dhananjai Mohan 
 Bandhavgarh- Project Tiger 
 Forest resource use by people in Protected Areas and its implications for biodiversity conservation: The case of Bandhavgarh National Park in India
 Wildlife Times: The Central Indian Tiger Pilgrimage - A trip report 
 Map and details of Bandhavgarh Tiger Reserve in Project Tiger website

Tiger reserves of India
National parks in Madhya Pradesh
Protected areas established in 1968
Umaria district
Important Bird Areas of India
Animal reintroduction
Wildlife conservation in India
1968 establishments in Madhya Pradesh